A book of poetry of the same name by John Curtis Underwood was published in 1910 by G. P. Putnam's Sons as The Knickerbocker Press.

The Iron Muse (A Panorama of Industrial Folk Song) is the title of two albums released by Topic Records, the first as a 12-inch Long Play vinyl record released in 1963 and the other as a CD released in 1993.

The album is listed in the accompanying book to the Topic Records 70 year anniversary boxed set Three Score and Ten as one of their classic records with The Blackleg Miners as the sixth track and The Weavers March as the twentieth track on the sixth CD in the set.  Both tracks appear on the two versions of the album.

The Vinyl album 

The Iron Muse (A Panorama of Industrial Folk Song) arranged and produced by A. L. Lloyd is a thematic Industrial folk music album.  The featured singers and musicians are Anne Briggs, Bob Davenport, Ray Fisher, Louis Killen, A. L. Lloyd, Matt McGinn and The Celebrated Working Man's Band. John Tams considers it to be in the form of a radio ballad. The album was recorded at Champion's in Hampstead, London by Bill Leader and Paul Carter in an ad hoc studio set up in a large room. Colin Ross said that they had to wait for the coke fire to stop crackling before they could record the tracks. The album had a sleeve note commentary and a 4-page accompanying booklet with tune and song details, including lyrics, both written by A. L. Lloyd.

Side one consists of music and songs from coal mining, the majority of which are printed in a book of coalfield songs by A. L. Lloyd. The second side starts with a weaving tune and continues with songs covering weaving, foundry work and shipbuilding, and ends with a final coal mining song and a set of coalfield tunes.

This album was Anne Briggs's first recorded work. This was also Matt McGinn's first recorded work after he won a songwriting competition with "The Foreman O'Rourke".

In the booklet for the vinyl album, A. L. Lloyd writes that "The Poor Cotton Wayver" has a version to a different tune on Ewan MacColl's album Shuttle And Cage (1954), which had been published under the title of "The Four Loom Weaver" in MacColl's book The Shuttle And Cage.

The record was issued in America by Elektra in 1964, with the tracks ordered in a different sequence and without The Collier's Daughter.

Album Details 

The numbers in superscript brackets refer to the track number on the CD release.  
All songs and tunes are traditional except where the author is identified following the title.

Side One

 Miner's Dance Tunes ("Newburn Lads", "The Bonny Pit Laddie", "The Drunken Collier")
 "The Collier's Rant"
 "The Recruited Collier"
 "Pit Boots"
 "The Banks of the Dee"(22)
 "The Durham Lockout"
 "The Donibristle Moss Moran Disaster"
 "The Blackleg Miners"(6)
 "The Celebrated Working Man"
 "The Row Between The Cages" - Tommy Armstrong(23)
 "The Collier's Daughter"

Side Two
 "The Weavers' March"(11)
 "The Weaver and the Factory Maid"
 "The Spinner's Wedding"(12)
 "The Poor Cotton Wayver"
 "The Doffing Mistress"(14)
 "The Swan Necked Valve"
 "The Dundee Lassie"(17) 
 "The Foreman O'Rourke" - Matt McGinn
 "Farewell to the Monty"(26) - Louis Killen
 Miner's Dance Tunes ("The Jolly Colliers", "The Keelman over Land", "Sma' Coals an' Little Money")

Personnel 

 Anne Briggs - Vocals (Side One: 3 / Side Two: 5)
 Bob Davenport - Vocals (Side One: 2,7,10)
 Ray Fisher - Vocals (Side Two: 3,7)
 Louis Killen - Vocals (Side One: 5,6,8 / Side Two: 9)
 A. L. Lloyd - Vocals (Side One: 4,9 / Side Two: 2,4)
 Matt McGinn - Vocals (Side Two: 6,8)
 Celebrated Working Mans Band - (Alf Edwards, Concertina; Colin Ross, Fiddle; Jim Bray, Double Bass)(Side One: 1,2,10,11 / Side Two: 1,6,10)

The songs from Come All ye Bold Miners are included here on Side One: 1 2,3,5,6,7,8,10.

The Compact Disk 

The second album with the same name was released as a compilation with only eight of the original tracks, the remainder being from other albums of the same period. None of the A. L. Lloyd or Matt McGinn songs appeared on the CD.

CD Tracks

All songs and tunes are traditional except where the author is identified following the title.
All the authors listed below are from the Allmusic website.

Tracks from the original album also appearing on the CD are marked with (*). 
 "The Sandgate Girl's Lament / Elsie Marley"
 "Doon the Waggonway"
 "A Miner's Life"
 "The Coal-Owner and the Pitman's Wife"
 "The Trimdon Grange Explosion" - Tommy Armstrong
 "The Blackleg Miners" (*)
 "The Auchengeich Disaster" - Norman Buchan
 "Ee Aye, Aa Cud Hew"
 "The Durham Lockout" - Tommy Armstrong
 "Aa'm Glad the Strike's Done" - Thomas Kerr
 "The Weaver's March" (*)
 "The Spinner's Wedding" (*)
 "Oh Dear Me (The Jute Mill Song)"
 "The Doffing Mistress" (*)
 "The Little Piecer" - D. J. Brookes
 "The Hand-Loom Weaver's Lament"
 "The Dundee Lassie" (*)
 "Success to the Weavers"
 "Fourpence a Day"
 "Up the Raw"
 "Bonny Woodha'"
 "The Banks of the Dee" (*)
 "The Row Between the Cages" - Tommy Armstrong (*)
 "Aw Wish Pay Friday Would Come" - James Anderson
 "Keep Your Feet Still, Georgie Hinny" - Louis Killen
 "Farewell to the Monty" (*)

Personnel on the CD release 
All track numbers are listed alongside the artists' names.
 Anne Briggs - Vocals (14)
 Bob Davenport - Vocals (23)
 Ray Fisher - Vocals (12,17)
 Louis Killen - Vocals (5,6,20,22,24,25,26)
 Celebrated Working Mans Band (Alf Edwards Concertina, Colin Ross Fiddle, Jim Bray Double Bass) (11,23)
 High Level Ranters - (1,2,10)
 Tommy Giffellon (3)
 Ewan MacColl acc. Peggy Seeger - Vocals (4,13,19)
 Dick Gaughan - Vocals (7,21)
 Ed Pickford - Vocals (8)
 Maureen Craik - Vocals (9)
 Dave Brooks - Vocals (15)
 Harry Boardman - Vocals (16)
 The Oldham Tinkers - Vocals (18)

Source Topic Albums for tracks on the CD release 

 6, 11–12, 14, 17, 22–23, 26: The Iron Muse. A Panorama of Industrial Folk Music 1963
 5, 24: Louis Killen, Colin Ross, Johnny Handle: The Colliers' Rant 1962
 20, 25: Louis Killen, Colin Ross, Johnny Handle: Northumbrian Garland 1962
 4, 19: Ewan MacColl: Shuttle and Cage 1957 and Steam Whistle Ballads 1964
 13: Ewan MacColl: Second Shift 1958 and Steam Whistle Ballads 1964
 9: Louis Killen, Tom Gilfellon, Colin Ross, Maureen Craik, Johnny Handle: Tommy Armstrong of Tyneside 1965
 1: The High Level Ranters: Northumberland For Ever 1968
 16: Deep Lancashire 1968
 15: Owdham Edge 1970
 18: The Oldham Tinkers: Oldham's Burning Sands 1971
 8: Canny Newcassell 1972
 2–3, 7, 10, 21: The High Level Ranters with Harry Boardman and Dick Gaughan: The Bonnie Pit Laddie 1975

References 

1963 albums
1993 albums
Anne Briggs albums
A. L. Lloyd albums
Topic Records albums